Eugene John Gerber (April 30, 1931 – September 29, 2018) was an American prelate of the Roman Catholic Church. He served as bishop of the Diocese of Dodge City in Kansas from 1976 to 1982, and bishop of the Diocese of Wichita in Kansas from 1982 to 2001.

Biography

Early life 
Eugene Gerber was born in Kingman, Kansas, to Cornelius and Lena (née Tiesmeyer) Gerber. The fourth of seven children, he had two brothers, Jerome and Larry, and four sisters, Kathleen, Helen, Leola, and Joan. At his baptism on May 1, 1931, the officiating priest predicted to Gerber's father, "Some day this boy will become a priest!" 

Gerber was raised on a farm in Waterloo, Kansas, and entered Immaculate Conception Seminary in Conception, Missouri, in 1945. Two years later, he transferred to Kingman High School, where he was known as a Frank Sinatra look-alike and graduated in 1949.

Gerber studied accounting at Wichita State University before returning to Immaculate Conception Seminary. In May 1955, he graduated from St. Thomas Aquinas Seminary in Denver, Colorado.  He obtained a Bachelor of Philosophy degree (1955), a Master of Religious Education degree (1958), and a Bachelor of Sacred Theology degree through the seminary's affiliation with the Catholic University of America. Gerber became a subdeacon and later a deacon in 1958.

Priesthood 
Gerber was ordained to the priesthood for the Diocese of Wichita by Bishop Mark Carroll on May 19, 1959.  After his ordination, Gerber served as an associate pastor at St. Anne and Church of the Parishes in Wichita. In 1962, he became an instructor at Notre Dame High School in Wichita, teaching algebra and religion, and working as a guidance counselor. He also served as moderator of the Catholic Youth Organization.

In May 1963, Gerber was named assistant chancellor for the diocese and associate pastor of Holy Savior Parish. He also earned a Bachelor of Education degree from Wichita State University in June 1963. In addition to his role as assistant chancellor, Gerber became secretary to Bishop Leo Bryne and associate pastor of St. Thomas Aquinas Parish in August 1964. He was appointed vice chancellor of the diocese (1965), business manager of the diocesan newspaper (1967), and associate pastor at St. Mary Cathedral (1968).

In 1969, Gerber was appointed to the governing board of the Holy Family Center for the mentally disabled. He became diocesan director of the Cursillo movement in 1970, and chancellor in 1973. Continuing as chancellor, Gerber served as pastor of Blessed Sacrament Parish in Wichita from 1973 to 1975.

In October 1975, Gerber was sent to Rome to undertake his postgraduate studies in theology and Scripture. He received a Licentiate of Sacred Theology summa cum laude from the Angelicum. Upon his return to the Kansas in February 1976, Gerber resumed his work as chancellor and was appointed chaplain to the Sisters of St. Joseph and vicar for religious.

Bishop of Dodge City 
On October 16, 1976, Gerber was appointed the third bishop of the Diocese of Dodge City by Pope Paul VI. He received his episcopal consecration on December 14, 1976, from Bishop David Maloney, with Bishops Marion Forst and Richard Hanifen serving as co-consecrators. After Ignatius J. Strecker, Gerber was the second native of the Wichita diocese to become a bishop.

Gerber was formally installed as bishop on December 15, 1976, at the Dodge City Civic Center. He served on the National Conference of Catholic Bishops (NCCB) Ad Hoc Committee on Parish Renewal for four years.

Bishop of Wichita
Gerber was later named the sixth bishop of the Diocese of Wichita by Pope John Paul II on November 17, 1982. Within the next twenty days, both of his parents died. Gerber was installed on February 9, 1983.

During his tenure, he served on the NCCB Ad Hoc Committee for Parish Renewal; the NCCB Committee on the Permanent Diaconate; two terms on the Administrative Board of the National Conference of Catholic Bishops, representing Region IX; on the NCCB Liaison Committee with the Leadership Conference of Women Religious (LCWR); the Communications Committee; the Pastoral Research and Practices Committee; the Liaison Committee with NC News; the NCCB Pro-Life Committee; Committee for Women in Society and the Church; and the Ad Hoc Committee on Stewardship. 

Locally, Gerber served as a board member for the Wichita Urban League, Via Christi Health Systems, HopeNet, Kansas Foodbank Warehouse, Inc., and Wichita Grand Opera. He received Thomas J. Olmsted as a coadjutor bishop in April 1999.

Retirement and legacy 
John Paul II accepted Gerber's resignation as bishop of Wichita on October 4, 2001. He then served as a chaplain to the Discalced Carmelite Sisters and as a spiritual director for priests.  Eugene Gerber died at age 87 at a Wichita hospital on September 29, 2018, after suffering a heart attack while driving earlier in the day.

See also
 

 Catholic Church hierarchy
 Catholic Church in the United States
 Historical list of the Catholic bishops of the United States
 List of Catholic bishops of the United States
 Lists of patriarchs, archbishops, and bishops

References

External links
Roman Catholic Diocese of Wichita Official Site

Episcopal succession

1931 births
2018 deaths
American people of German descent
Wichita State University alumni
Catholic University of America alumni
People from Kingman, Kansas
Roman Catholic bishops of Dodge City
Roman Catholic bishops of Wichita
20th-century Roman Catholic bishops in the United States
21st-century Roman Catholic bishops in the United States